The Armed Forces Service Medal (AFSM) is a military award of the United States military that was created on January 11, 1996, by President Bill Clinton under .  The AFSM is a deployed service medal that is presented to those service members who engage in "significant activity" for which no other U.S. campaign or service medal is authorized.

Appearance 
The Armed Forces Service Medal is a round bronze medal  in diameter. The obverse of the medal bears a demi-torch, as held by the Statue of Liberty, with rays radiating from behind the torch. Encircling at the top is the inscription ARMED FORCES SERVICE MEDAL. The reverse bears the eagle found on the United States Department of Defense seal. Below is a laurel wreath with the inscription IN PURSUIT OF DEMOCRACY at the top.

Criteria
The Armed Forces Service Medal is the non-combat parallel of the Armed Forces Expeditionary Medal which is normally awarded for combat operations and other combat support missions.

The AFSM may be awarded to service members who, on or after June 1, 1992:

 Participate, or have participated, as members of U.S. military units, in a designated U.S. military operation deemed to be a significant activity.
 Encounter no foreign armed opposition or imminent hostile action.

The term "significant activity" is determined by theater commanders and is normally deemed to be participation in a U.S. military operation considered to hold a high degree of scope, impact, and international significance that the operation warrants the presentation of a permanent service medal.

Service members must have been permanently assigned, attached, or detailed to a unit that deployed to participate in a designated U.S. operation within the area of eligibility for 30 consecutive days (or for the full period when an operation is less than 30 days) or for 60 non-consecutive days.

Aircrew members must have participated as a regular assigned crew member on an aircraft flying into, out of, within, or over the area of eligibility in direct support of the designated military operation for 30 consecutive days or 60 non-consecutive days. One day of service is credited for the first sortie flown on any day. Additional sorties flown on the same day receive no further credit.

The AFSM may be authorized for U.S. military operations for which no other U.S. campaign or service medal is appropriate such as:
 Peacekeeping operations
 Prolonged humanitarian operations
 U.S. military operations in direct support of the United Nations (UN) or the North Atlantic Treaty Organization (NATO), and for operations of assistance to friendly foreign nations. The award is only appropriate if the NATO, UN, or foreign operation involves a concurrent U.S. military support operation.

The AFSM is not authorized for participation in national or international exercises. For operations in which personnel of only one military department participate, the AFSM will be awarded only if there is no other suitable award available to the department.

 Additional awards and devices
One award of the Armed Forces Service Medal is authorized for each designated military operation. Only one AFSM is awarded for multiple deployments for the same designated operation. Subsequent awards are denoted by wearing a bronze service star on the AFSM suspension and service ribbon. 
A silver service star is worn in lieu of five bronze service stars.

Approved operations 

As an exception to Department of Defense policy, the Armed Forces Expeditionary Medal and the Armed Forces Service Medal may be awarded concurrently for Operations Joint Guard and Joint Endeavor.

See also
 Humanitarian Service Medal

References

External links 

 

Awards established in 1996
United States service medals